Carmen & Lola is a 2018 Spanish drama film directed by Arantxa Echevarría which stars Zaira Romero and Rosy Rodríguez alongside Moreno Borja, Rafaela León and Carolina Yuste. It was selected to screen in the Directors' Fortnight section at the 2018 Cannes Film Festival.

Plot
Carmen lives in a Romani community in the suburbs of Madrid. Like every other woman she has ever met, she is destined to live a life that is repeated generation after generation: getting married and raising as many children as possible. But one day she meets Lola, an uncommon Romani woman who dreams about going to university and draws bird graffiti. Carmen quickly develops an understanding with Lola who's shy, independent and likes girls. They discover a world that, inevitably, leads them to be rejected by their families.

Cast

Production 
The film was produced by TVTEC Servicios Audiovisuales with the support of Orange España, the Madrid regional administration and ICAA.

Release 
Selected to screen in the Directors' Fortnight independent section of the 71st Cannes Film Festival, the film premiered on 15 May 2018. Distributed by Super 8 Distribución, it opened in Spanish theatres on 7 September 2018.

Reception
On review aggregator Rotten Tomatoes, the film holds an approval rating of 90%, based on 21 reviews, with an average rating of 6.8/10.

Accolades 

|-
| align = "center" | 2018 || 23rd Toulouse Spanish Film Festival || colspan = "2" | Golden Violet ||  || align = "center" | 
|-
| align = "center" rowspan = "14" | 2019 || rowspan = "4" | 6th Feroz Awards || colspan = "2" | Best Drama Film ||  || rowspan = "4" | 
|-
| Best Director || Arancha Echevarría || 
|-
| Best Screenplay || Arancha Echevarría || 
|-
| Best Trailer || Pedro Jiménez ||  
|-
| rowspan = "8" | 33rd Goya Awards || colspan = "2" | Best Film ||  || rowspan = "8" | 
|-
| Best New Director || Arancha Echevarría || 
|-
| Best Original Screenplay || Arancha Echevarría || 
|-
| Best Supporting Actress || Carolina Yuste || 
|-
| rowspan = "2" | Best New Actress || Rosy Rodríguez || 
|-
| Zaira Moreno || 
|-
| Best New Actor || Moreno Borja || 
|-
| Best Original Song || "Me vas a extrañar" by Paco de la Rosa || 
|-
| rowspan = "2" | 28th Actors and Actresses Union Awards || Best Film Actress in a Secondary Role || Carolina Yuste ||  || rowspan = "2" | 
|-
| Best New Actress || Zaira Romero ||  
|}

See also 
 List of Spanish films of 2018

References

External links
 

2018 films
2018 drama films
Spanish drama films
2010s Spanish-language films
Spanish LGBT-related films
2018 LGBT-related films
Lesbian-related films
Films about Romani people
LGBT-related romantic drama films
2010s teen romance films
2010s teen drama films
Teen LGBT-related films
Films shot in Madrid
Films set in Madrid
Films about evangelicalism
2010s Spanish films